Musaabad (also Romanized as Mūsáābād; also known as Mūsáābād-e Jām) is a village in Jolgeh-ye Musaabad Rural District, in the Central District of Torbat-e Jam County, Razavi Khorasan Province, Iran. At the 2006 census, its population was 968, in 230 families.

References 

Populated places in Torbat-e Jam County